Extreme Makeover: Home Edition: How'd They Do That? is an American reality television series that originally ran from November 1, 2004 to May 23, 2005 on ABC.

Episodes

References

External links 
 

2000s American reality television series
Extreme Makeover: Home Edition
American Broadcasting Company original programming
2004 American television series debuts
2005 American television series endings
American television spin-offs
Reality television spin-offs
Television series about families